Cottage Grove is a village in Dane County, Wisconsin, United States. Its population was 7,303 at the 2020 census. A suburb of Madison, it shares a school district with Monona. The village is located partially within the Town of Cottage Grove.

The village was named from a settler's cottage in a grove near the village site.

Geography
Cottage Grove is located at  (43.088017, -89.200143).

Demographics

2010 census
As of the census of 2010, 6,192 people, 2,210 households, and 1,628 families wereliving in the village. The racial makeup of the village was 92.1% White, 2.5% African American, 0.2% Native American, 2.2% Asian, 1.1% from other races, and 2.0% from two or more races. Hispanics or Latinos of any race were 3.0% of the population.

Of the 2,210 households, 47.1% had children under 18 living with them, 59.4% were married couples living together, 9.3% had a female householder with no husband present, 4.9% had a male householder with no wife present, and 26.3% were not families. About 20.2% of all households were made up of individuals, and 9.0% had someone living alone who was 65 or older. The average household size was 2.80. and the average family size was 3.26.

The median age in the village was 33.8 years. About 32.5% of residents were under 18; 5.7% were between 18 and 24; 32.4% were from 25 to 44; 21.7% were from 45 to 64; and 7.7% were 65 or older. The gender makeup of the village was 49.0% male and 51.0% female.

2000 census
As of the census of 2000,  4,059 people, 1,427 households, and 1,084 families were living in the village. The population density was 1,775.3 people per square mile (684.4/km2). The 1,453 housing units had an average density of 635.5 per square mile (245.0/km2). The racial makeup of the village was 95.71% White, 1.82% African American, 0.25% Native American, 0.49% Asian, 0.54% from other races, and 1.18% from two or more races. Around 1.80% of the population were Hispanics or Latinos of any race.

Of the 1,427 households, 47.3% had children under 18 living with them, 65.0% were married couples living together, 7.5% had a female householder with no husband present, and 24.0% were not families. About 16.1% of all households were made up of individuals, and 6.0% had someone living alone who was 65 or older. The average household size was 2.83, and the average family size was 3.20.

In the village, the age distribution was 32.1% under 18, 5.6% from 18 to 24, 42.1% from 25 to 44, 14.3% from 45 to 64, and 6.0% who were 65 or older. The median age was 31 years. For every 100 females, there were 102.5 males. For every 100 females 18 and over, there were 97.3 males.

The median income for a household in the village was $66,628, and for a family was $68,667. Males had a median income of $46,190 versus $30,391 for females. The per capita income for the village was $25,777. About 2.7% of families and 3.8% of the population were below the poverty line, including 4.6% of those under 18 and 12.6% of those 65 or over.

Notable people

 Gabe Carimi (born 1988), All-American and NFL football player
William Robert Taylor, 12th governor of Wisconsin (1874-1876)
Jessie Vetter, USA Women's National Ice Hockey Team, 2010 Olympic Winter Games silver medalist

References

External links
 Village of Cottage Grove

Villages in Wisconsin
Villages in Dane County, Wisconsin
Madison, Wisconsin, metropolitan statistical area